Charles Maximilian Siem (born 14 January 1986) is an English contemporary classical violinist.

Life and career
Charlie Siem was born in London, England, to Kristian Siem, a Norwegian businessman, and his South African-born wife. He has three sisters, all involved in arts: musician and composer Sasha Siem, visual artist and healing arts/yoga teacher Sophie Madeleine Siem, and artist and model Louisa Tatiana Kristianne Siem.

Siem began the study of violin at age three when his interest was piqued upon hearing the cassettes his mother used to play for her children.  He went on to study at Eton College and Girton College, Cambridge, and continued his violin studies with Itzhak Rashkovsky and Shlomo Mintz. He performed his first concerto with an orchestra at age 15, and played with the Royal Philharmonic Orchestra at age 18. He has gained recognition in the past few years by playing alongside artists such as The Who and Miley Cyrus. Among his fans include Lady Gaga and Katy Perry. 

Siem is distantly related to Norwegian violin virtuoso and composer Ole Bull.

He plays a violin made by Guarneri del Gesu from 1735, also known as "The d'Egville". The violin was previously owned by Yehudi Menuhin.

A great believer in devoting time to worthwhile causes, Siem is an ambassador for The Prince's Trust.

Reviews
 "Siem also had the deep heart and soul required to make the music sing, in a great romantic combination of drama, passion and tenderness."
 "Under the Stars" Album of the week on Classic FM "A very attractive selection of favourites, performed with the violinist's trademark grace and intimacy."
 Gramophone, "Charlie Siem, allowing his tone to soar in a great arch, creates a memorable high-point."
 "These performances show that his music-making is more than capable of speaking for itself without any kind of special pleading."  The Guardian
 "...Charlie Siem completely broke people's prejudices with his performance, proving himself through his music and demonstrating the charm of 'the most exciting young violinist in the contemporary music world' on the stage of Beijing Concert Hall. Charlie presented the Beijing audience with masterpieces and sonatas such as Violin Sonata No. 9 "Kreutzer" by Beethoven, Violin Sonata No. 3 by Grieg, Zigeunerweisen by Sarasate and more....His performance was a consummate display of skill. He captivated the audience with his extremely impressive playing, calm stage presence, handsome appearance and astonishing technique." China Art News

Discography
Siem has released CDs through the years:
 Charlie Siem – Elgar & Grieg (Sonatas for Violin and Piano) - Andrei Korobeinikov - Challenge Classics
 Charlie Siem – Violin Virtuoso - Warner Classics
 Charlie Siem – Bruch, Wieniawski, Ole Bull – The London Symphony Orchestra – Andrew Gourlay - Warner Classics
 Charlie Siem – Tony Banks: six pieces for orchestra - The City of Prague Philharmonic Orchestra - Martin Robertson - Paul Englishby - Naxos
 Charlie Siem – Under The Stars – Münchner Rundfunkorchester – Paul Goodwin – Sony Classical
 Charlie Siem – Midnight Garden - Paravox Records
 Charlie Siem – Between the Clouds - Itamar Golan - Signum Classics

References

External links
 Charlie Siem Official Website
 Charlie Siem Unofficial Website, launched in January 2016
 
 
 
 

1986 births
Alumni of Girton College, Cambridge
Living people
Musicians from London
English classical violinists
English classical musicians
British male violinists
English people of Norwegian descent
English people of South African descent
English male models
21st-century English musicians
21st-century classical violinists
21st-century British male musicians
Male classical violinists